This is a list of what are intended to be the notable top hotels by country, five or four star hotels, notable skyscraper landmarks or historic hotels which are covered in multiple reliable publications. It should not be a directory of every hotel in every country:

Saint-Barthélemy
Cheval Blanc, St Barths
Eden Rock, St Barths
Hotel Le Toiny

Saint Lucia
Anse Chastanet

Saint Martin
Belmond La Samanna

Saudi Arabia
Makkah Clock Royal Tower Hotel, Mecca

Serbia

Singapore

Slovenia

 Grand Hotel Union, Ljubljana
 Kempinski Palace Hotel
 Mokrice Castle, Jesenice, Brežice
 Otočec Castle, Otočec
 Podsmreka Castle, Podsmreka pri Višnji Gori

Somalia
Muna Hotel, Mogadishu

South Africa

South Korea
Design and Arts Arcadia of Myungseung
Dragon Hill Lodge, Seoul
Grand Hyatt Seoul
Koreana Hotel, Seoul
Lotte Hotel Busan
Sheraton Incheon Hotel

Spain

Sri Lanka

Sudan
Acropole Hotel, Khartoum
Meridien Hotel, Khartoum

Swaziland
Royal Swazi Sun Hotel, Ezulwini valley

Sweden

Gothenburg
Clarion Hotel Post
Hotel Gothia Towers

Stockholm

Clas på Hörnet
Grand Hotel Saltsjöbaden
Grand Hôtel, Stockholm
Hotel Rival
Lady Hutton
Rica Talk Hotel
Scandic Hotel Ariadne
Victoria Tower

Elsewhere
Copperhill Mountain Lodge
Fabriken Furillen

Switzerland

 Badrutt's Palace Hotel, St Moritz
 Beau-Rivage, Geneva
 Beau-Rivage Palace, Lausanne
 Berghotel Schatzalp, Davos
 Hotel Bellevue Palace, Bern
 Hotel Les Trois Rois, Basel
 Hotel Paxmontana, Sachseln
 Grand Hotel Dolder, Zurich
 Grand Hotel Kronenhof, Pontresina
 Helmhaus, Zurich
 Kurhaus Bergün, Bergün
 Monte Rosa Hotel, Zermatt
 Null Stern Hotel, Teufen
 Posthotel Rössli, Gstaad
 Rigi Kulm Hotel
 Sporthotel Pontresina
 Swissôtel Zürich, Zürich
 Teufelhof Basel
 Therme Vals, Graubünden
 Waldhaus Flims, Flims

Syria

 Baron Hotel, Aleppo
 Beit al-Mamlouka Hotel, Damascus
 Blue Tower Hotel, Damascus
 Four Seasons Hotel Damascus, Damascus
 Sheraton Aleppo Hotel, Aleppo

References

S